Only for the Lonely is the second solo studio by American rhythm and blues and gospel singer Mavis Staples. It was released on October 12, 1970, by Volt Records.

Critical reception

In the Billboard issue dated October 24, 1970, a review was published saying, "This album is at once dramatic and sensuous, and warm and appealing. Mavis Staples is cast in the same mold that produced recording greats like Aretha
Franklin, Nancy Wilson and Etta James, and she can really deliver a song. Included here are "It Makes Me Want to Cry," "How Many Times," "Since I Fell for You" and "Endlessly".

Cashbox published a review of the album in the issue dated October 31, 1970, which said, "Mavis Staples is a brilliant songstress with an incredibly powerful voice. Listening to her perform on an album, one cannot help but feel that she is in fact performing live in your living room. "I Have Learned to Do Without You," "Endlessly," "Since I Fell for You," and "It Makes Me Wanna Cry," are among the more impressive cuts, but each is a gem in its own right. For Mavis, it's the second release in a bright, shining career."

Track listing

Personnel
Adapted from the album liner notes.
 Barry Beckett - keyboards
 Joel Brodsky  - photography
 Vernon Bullock - guitar, keyboards
 Ron Capone  - engineer
 Steve Cropper - guitar
 Don Davis - engineer
 Donald "Duck" Dunn - bass
 Eli Fountain - percussion, saxophone
 Marlin Greene - engineer
 Don Hahn - producer, engineer
 Roger Hawkins - drums
 Isaac Hayes - organ
 Eddie Hinton - guitar
 David Hood - bass
 Al Jackson, Jr. - drums
 David Krieger  - art direction
 Herb Kole - art supervisor
 George McGregor - drums
 Ray Monette - guitar
 Tony Newton - bass
 Horace Ott - string arrangements
 Paul Richmond - mastering
 Rudy Robinson - keyboards
 Mavis Staples - lead vocals
 Marvell Thomas - piano

Charts

References

Mavis Staples albums
1970 albums
albums arranged by Horace Ott
Albums produced by Don Davis (record producer)
Albums recorded at Muscle Shoals Sound Studio
Stax Records albums